Davy is a 1958 British comedy-drama film directed by Michael Relph and starring Harry Secombe, Alexander Knox and Ron Randell. It was the last comedy to be made by Ealing Studios and had the distinction of being the first British film in Technirama.  Davy was intended to launch the solo career of Harry Secombe, who was already a popular British radio personality on The Goon Show, but it was only moderately successful.

Plot
A young entertainer is conflicted over the chance of a big break. He has to decide whether to remain with his family's music hall act or to go solo.

Main cast

 Harry Secombe as Davy Morgan 
 Alexander Knox as Sir Giles Manning 
 Ron Randell as George 
 George Relph as Uncle Pat Morgan 
 Susan Shaw as Gwen 
 Bill Owen as Eric 
 Isabel Dean as Miss Helen Carstairs 
 Adele Leigh as Joanna Reeves 
 Peter Frampton as Tim 
 Joan Sims as Tea Lady 
 Gladys Henson as Beatrice, Tea Lady 
 George Moon as Jerry 
 Clarkson Rose as Mrs. Magillicuddy 
 Kenneth Connor as Herbie 
 Liz Fraser as Tea Lady 
 Charles Lamb as Henry 
 Arnold Marlé as Mr. Winkler 
 Campbell Singer as Stage Doorkeeper

Peter Frampton, who plays young Tim, was the son of Harry Frampton, makeup artist for many years at Ealing including in this film. Peter would eventually follow in his father's footsteps and worked as his assistant on several films, including Hitchcock's Frenzy (1972). In 1995, Peter Frampton won the Oscar for Best Makeup for Braveheart. He remembered his filming on Davy fondly, as "it meant time off school and (getting the) star treatment."

Reception

Box office
According to MGM records, the film earned only $40,000 in the US and Canada and $265,000 elsewhere, resulting in a loss of $279,000.

Critical
TV Guide called the film a "pleasant if unimpressive drama"; Britmovie wrote, "stylistically the film is an awkward combination of broad farce, Secombe having made his name as one of the denizens of the celebrated Goon Show, and awkward, turgid scenes of moral conflict"; while Allmovie noted, "a stellar supporting cast enables Davy to overcome its occasional banalities and cliches."

References

External links

Review of film at Variety

1958 films
1958 comedy-drama films
British comedy-drama films
Ealing Studios films
1958 comedy films
1958 drama films
1950s English-language films
1950s British films